The Association for the Promotion of Skiing (or Skiforeningen) is a large association in Norway promoting Nordic skiing and other outdoor recreational activities.

Skiforeningen was founded in 1883 and has about 70 000 members. It maintains several thousand kilometers of cross country ski trails in Oslomarka and holds several events at Holmenkollen.

References

External links
 Skiforeningen English website

Nordic skiing organizations
Sports organisations of Norway
1883 establishments in Norway
Nordic skiing